Pine Lake is a lake in Cass County, Minnesota, in the United States.

Pine Lake was named from the white pine trees lining the lake.

See also
List of lakes in Minnesota

References

Lakes of Minnesota
Lakes of Cass County, Minnesota